Michael Fallon (born 15 June 1980 in Portumna, County Galway) known as Mike Denver, is an Irish country singer.

Career
Starting touring at age 16, he later on met manager Willie Carty who signed him. Denver recorded his first album Wings to Fly in 2003. In 2008, he recorded a song with George Jones titled "The Real Deal". He has released a number of albums. His 2016 album Cut Loose reached No.1 in the Irish album charts. Denver was awarded Entertainer of the Year in 2016.

Discography

Albums
Studio albums
Wings to Fly (2003)
Love to Live (2006)
Messenger Boy (2007)
Absent Friends (2008)
Seasons in the Sun (2008)
The Galway Boy (2009)
Got a Funny Feelin (2009)
Tradition (2010)
Thank God for the Radio (2010)
Cut Loose (2016)

Live and special releases
Christmas Country (2008)
Mike Denver Live (2008)
The Essential Galway Boy Collection (2009)
Vintage Country (2011)
Mike Denver Live (2012)
There's Only One Mike Denver (2013)
Souvenirs (2013)
So Far So Good (2021)

Singles
"Nancy Mulligan"
"(My Dear Old) Galway Bay" (2020)

References

External links
 Official site
 Mike Denver CDs & DVDs
 

Living people
Irish country singers
People from County Galway
1980 births
21st-century Irish  male singers